Fiume is the historical name of Rijeka, a city in Croatia.

Fiume may also refer to:

Geography
 Free State of Fiume, a historic state that existed between 1920 and 1924
 Fiume Veneto, a municipality in the Italian region Friuli-Venezia Giulia
 Fiume di Girgenti, a river of Sicily rising from hills south of the city of Agrigento
 Fiume Grande, a river of northern Sicily flowing into the Tyrrhenian sea near Palermo

Other
 Italian cruiser Fiume of the Italian Regia Marina
 Gloria Fiume, an old Italian football association now renamed HNK Rijeka
 Paolo Dal Fiume, Italian footballer
 Salvatore Fiume, an Italian painter, sculptor, architect and writer